Carl Bertil Myrsten (1 May 1920 – 28 July 2000) was a Swedish director and ship-owner.

Career
Myrsten was born in Slite, Sweden, the son of ship owner Gustaf Myrsten and his wife Märta (née Löfvenberg). He was the brother of Robert Myrsten. He passed studentexamen in Visby in 1940 and enrolled at Frans Schartau Business Institute in 1943. He became reserve officer in 1945 and was CEO and owner of Rederi AB Slite from 1947. Rederi AB Slite, which Myrsten formed in 1946, went bankrupt in 1993.

Myrsten was a member of Neptuniorden and vice chairman of Gotland guild.

Personal life
In 1948, Myrsten married Britt-Marie Rodhe (born 1920), the daughter of the accountant Esaias Rodhe and Mia Nosslin. He was the father of Charlotte (born 1949), Gerd (born 1951), Elise (born 1953) and Gustaf (born 1956).

References

Further reading

External links
Entry about Myrsten 

1920 births
2000 deaths
Swedish businesspeople in shipping
People from Gotland